Streptomyces cocklensis is a bacterium species from the genus of Streptomyces which has been isolated from soil from the Cockle Park Experimental Farm in Northumberland in the United Kingdom. Streptomyces cocklensis produces dioxamycin.

See also 
 List of Streptomyces species

References

Further reading

External links
Type strain of Streptomyces cocklensis at BacDive -  the Bacterial Diversity Metadatabase

cocklensis
Bacteria described in 2012